This is a list of films produced, co-produced, and/or distributed by First National Pictures.

Films

{| class="wikitable sortable"
|-
! Release Date
! Title
! class="unsortable" | Notesf
|-
| align="right"| June 23, 1917 || On Trial || Distribution
|-
| align="right"| September 23, 1917 ||  || Distribution
|-
| align="right"| December 3, 1917 || Alimony || Distribution
|-
| align="right"| December 23, 1917 || Daughter of Destiny || Distribution
|-
| align="right"| February 1918 ||  || Distribution
|-
| align="right"| March 1918 ||  || Distribution
|-
| align="right"| March 10, 1918 || My Four Years in Germany || Distribution
|-
| align="right"| April 2, 1918 || Tarzan of the Apes || Distribution
|-
| align="right"| April 14, 1918 ||  || Distribution
|-
| align="right"| April 30, 1918 ||  || Distribution
|-
| align="right"| May 21, 1918 || Pershing's Crusaders || Distribution
|-
| align="right"| June 1, 1918 ||  || Distribution
|-
| align="right"| June 23, 1918 || Tempered Steel || Distribution
|-
| align="right"| July 6, 1918 || Empty Pockets || Distribution
|-
| align="right"| October 1918 ||  || Distribution
|-
| align="right"| October 1, 1918 ||  || Distribution
|-
| align="right"| December 29, 1918 || Virtuous Wives || Distribution
|-
| align="right"| January 19, 1919 ||  || Distribution
|-
| align="right"| January 19, 1919 || Auction of Souls || Distribution
|-
| align="right"| March 10, 1919 ||  || Distribution
|-
| align="right"| April 15, 1919 || Whom the Gods Would Destroy || Distribution
|-
| align="right"| May 4, 1919 || Mary Regan || Distribution
|-
| align="right"| May 11, 1919 || Daddy-Long-Legs || Distribution
|-
| align="right"| May 11, 1919 ||  || Distribution
|-
| align="right"| June 22, 1919 || Bill Apperson's Boy || Distribution
|-
| align="right"| August 24, 1919 || Burglar by Proxy || Distribution
|-
| align="right"| September 1, 1919 ||  || Distribution
|-
| align="right"| September 14, 1919 ||  || Distribution
|-
| align="right"| September 21, 1919 || Her Kingdom of Dreams || Distribution
|-
| align="right"| September 29, 1919 || Back to God's Country || Distribution
|-
| align="right"| October 1919 || In Wrong || Distribution
|-
| align="right"| October 1919 ||  || Distribution
|-
| align="right"| November 10, 1919 ||  || Distribution
|-
| align="right"| November 16, 1919 ||  || Distribution
|-
| align="right"| November 17, 1919 || Heart o' the Hills || Distribution
|-
| align="right"| December 15, 1919 || In Old Kentucky || Distribution
|-
| align="right"| December 28, 1919 ||  || Distribution
|-
| align="right"| December 1, 1919 ||  || Distribution
|-
| align="right"| January 6, 1920 ||  || Distribution
|-
| align="right"| January 15, 1920 || Even as Eve || Distribution
|-
| align="right"| January 25, 1920 || Two Weeks || Distribution
|-
| align="right"| February 1920 ||  || Distribution
|-
| align="right"| February 1, 1920 ||  || Distribution
|-
| align="right"| March 1920 || Polly of the Storm Country || Distribution
|-
| align="right"| March 1920 ||  || Distribution
|-
| align="right"| March 1, 1920 ||  || Distribution
|-
| align="right"| March 7, 1920 || In Search of a Sinner || Distribution
|-
| align="right"| March 15, 1920 ||  || Distribution
|-
| align="right"| March 21, 1920 ||  || Distribution
|-
| align="right"| March 29, 1920 ||  || Distribution
|-
| align="right"| April 1, 1920 || Passion's Playground || Distribution
|-
| align="right"| April 18, 1920 || Don't Ever Marry || Distribution
|-
| align="right"| April 18, 1920 ||  || Distribution
|-
| align="right"| May 3, 1920 ||  || Distribution
|-
| align="right"| June 15, 1920 || Married Life || Distribution
|-
| align="right"| June 28, 1920 || Yes or No? || Distribution
|-
| align="right"| July 1920 ||  || Distribution
|-
| align="right"| July 18, 1920 || Go and Get It || Distribution
|-
| align="right"| August 1920 || 45 Minutes from Broadway || Production and distribution
|-
| align="right"| August 1920 || Good References || Distribution
|-
| align="right"| August 1920 || What Women Love || Production and distribution
|-
| align="right"| August 1920 ||  || Distribution
|-
| align="right"| August 2, 1920 || Notorious Miss Lisle || Distribution
|-
| align="right"| August 16, 1920 ||  || Distribution
|-
| align="right"| September 12, 1920 ||  || Distribution
|-
| align="right"| September 13, 1920 || Harriet and the Piper || Distribution
|-
| align="right"| September 13, 1920 ||  || Distribution
|-
| align="right"| September 26, 1920 ||  || Distribution
|-
| align="right"| October 1920 || Curtain || Distribution
|-
| align="right"| October 1920 || In the Heart of a Fool || Distribution
|-
| align="right"| October 4, 1920 ||  || Distribution
|-
| align="right"| October 10, 1920 || Peaceful Valley || Distribution
|-
| align="right"| October 31, 1920 || Twin Beds || Distribution
|-
| align="right"| November 1920 || Old Dad || Distribution
|-
| align="right"| November 1, 1920 || Wet and Warmer || Distribution
|-
| align="right"| November 22, 1920 || Love, Honor and Behave || Distribution
|-
| align="right"| November 22, 1920 ||  || Distribution
|-
| align="right"| November 28, 1920 || Dangerous Business || Distribution
|-
| align="right"| December 1920 || The Truth About Husbands || Distribution
|-
| align="right"| December 12, 1920 || Passion || Distribution
|-
| align="right"| January 1921 || Habit || Distribution
|-
| align="right"| January 1921 || My Lady's Latchkey || Distribution
|-
| align="right"| January 1921 || Not Guilty || Distribution
|-
| align="right"| January 6, 1921 ||  || Distribution
|-
| align="right"| January 23, 1921 || Mama's Affair || Distribution
|-
| align="right"| February 6, 1921 ||  || Distribution
|-
| align="right"| February 27, 1921 ||  || Distribution
|-
| align="right"| March 1921 || Scrambled Wives || Distribution
|-
| align="right"| March 23, 1921 || Trust Your Wife || Distribution
|-
| align="right"| March 27, 1921 || Man, Woman & Marriage || Distribution
|-
| align="right"| April 1921 ||  || Distribution
|-
| align="right"| April 1, 1921 || Jim the Penman || Distribution
|-
| align="right"| April 1, 1921 ||  || Distribution
|-
| align="right"| April 1, 1921 || Sowing the Wind || Distribution
|-
| align="right"| April 10, 1921 ||  || Distribution
|-
| align="right"| April 17, 1921 ||  || Distribution
|-
| align="right"| April 24, 1921 || Peck's Bad Boy || Distribution
|-
| align="right"| May 1921 || Courage || Distribution
|-
| align="right"| May 1921 || Lessons in Love || Distribution
|-
| align="right"| May 1921 || Playthings of Destiny || Distribution
|-
| align="right"| May 1921 || Scrap Iron || Distribution
|-
| align="right"| May 1921 ||  || Distribution
|-
| align="right"| May 1, 1921 || Bob Hampton of Placer || Distribution
|-
| align="right"| May 1, 1921 ||  || Distribution
|-
| align="right"| May 8, 1921 || Gypsy Blood || Distribution
|-
| align="right"| June 1921 || Love's Penalty || Distribution
|-
| align="right"| June 1921 || Stranger than Fiction || Distribution
|-
| align="right"| June 17, 1921 || Wedding Bells || Distribution
|-
| align="right"| June 26, 1921 || Salvation Nell || Distribution
|-
| align="right"| July 10, 1921 ||  || Distribution
|-
| align="right"| July 24, 1921 || Nobody || Distribution
|-
| align="right"| August 1, 1921 || Serenade || Distribution
|-
| align="right"| August 1, 1921 ||  || Distribution
|-
| align="right"| August 20, 1921 ||  || Distribution
|-
| align="right"| September 12, 1921 || Wife Against Wife || Distribution
|-
| align="right"| September 25, 1921 || One Arabian Night || Distribution
|-
| align="right"| September 26, 1921 || Bits of Life || Distribution
|-
| align="right"| October 10, 1921 ||  || Distribution
|-
| align="right"| October 17, 1921 || Two Minutes to Go || Distribution
|-
| align="right"| October 17, 1921 || Woman's Place || Distribution
|-
| align="right"| October 24, 1921 || Her Social Value || Distribution
|-
| align="right"| October 31, 1921 || My Lady Friends || Distribution
|-
| align="right"| November 7, 1921 ||  || Distribution
|-
| align="right"| November 7, 1921 ||  || Distribution
|-
| align="right"| November 20, 1921 || Molly O' || Distribution
|-
| align="right"| November 21, 1921 || Stardust || Distribution
|-
| align="right"| November 21, 1921 || Tol'able David || Distribution
|-
| align="right"| November 27, 1921 ||  || Distribution
|-
| align="right"| December 1921 || My Boy || Distribution
|-
| align="right"| December 5, 1921 || R.S.V.P. || Distribution
|-
| align="right"| December 12, 1921 || Her Mad Bargain || Distribution
|-
| align="right"| December 19, 1921 || Love's Redemption || Distribution
|-
| align="right"| December 26, 1921 ||  || Distribution
|-
| align="right"| December 26, 1921 ||  || Distribution
|-
| align="right"| January 1922 ||  || Distribution
|-
| align="right"| January 2, 1922 ||  || Distribution
|-
| align="right"| January 16, 1922 ||  || Distribution
|-
| align="right"| January 30, 1922 || Polly of the Follies || Distribution
|-
| align="right"| February 6, 1922 || The Seventh Day || Distribution
|-
| align="right"| February 6, 1922 || Shattered Idols || Distribution
|-
| align="right"| February 13, 1922 || Red Hot Romance || Distribution
|-
| align="right"| February 13, 1922 || Smilin' Through || Distribution
|-
| align="right"| February 20, 1922 || Penrod || Distribution
|-
| align="right"| February 27, 1922 || Kindred of the Dust || Distribution
|-
| align="right"| March 1922 || Gas, Oil and Water || Distribution
|-
| align="right"| March 1922 ||  || Distribution
|-
| align="right"| March 1922 ||  || Distribution
|-
| align="right"| April 2, 1922 ||  || Distribution
|-
| align="right"| May 1922 ||  || Distribution
|-
| align="right"| May 1922 || One Clear Call || Distribution
|-
| align="right"| May 1, 1922 ||  || Distribution
|-
| align="right"| May 15, 1922 ||  || Distribution
|-
| align="right"| May 22, 1922 || Sonny || Distribution
|-
| align="right"| May 27, 1922 || Fools First || Distribution
|-
| align="right"| June 1922 ||  || Distribution
|-
| align="right"| June 4, 1922 || Domestic Relations || Distribution
|-
| align="right"| June 22, 1922 ||  || Distribution
|-
| align="right"| July 1922 || Alias Julius Caesar || Distribution
|-
| align="right"| July 1922 || Hurricane's Gal || Distribution
|-
| align="right"| July 1922 ||  || Distribution
|-
| align="right"| July 1922 || Smudge || Distribution
|-
| align="right"| July 1922 || Rose o' the Sea || Distribution
|-
| align="right"| August 7, 1922 || Trouble || Distribution
|-
| align="right"| August 21, 1922 || Heroes and Husbands || Distribution
|-
| align="right"| September 1, 1922 || Skin Deep || Distribution
|-
| align="right"| September 1, 1922 ||  || Distribution
|-
| align="right"| September 17, 1922 ||  || Distribution
|-
| align="right"| October 1922 || White Shoulders || Distribution
|-
| align="right"| October 1, 1922 || Lorna Doone || Distribution
|-
| align="right"| October 8, 1922 ||  || Distribution
|-
| align="right"| October 15, 1922 || East Is West || Distribution
|-
| align="right"| October 30, 1922 || Oliver Twist || Distribution
|-
| align="right"| November 1, 1922 || Brawn of the North || Distribution
|-
| align="right"| December 1922 || Omar the Tentmaker || Distribution
|-
| align="right"| December 1922 ||  || Distribution
|-
| align="right"| December 4, 1922 || Minnie || Distribution
|-
| align="right"| December 25, 1922 ||  || Distribution
|-
| align="right"| January 1, 1923 || Fury || Distribution
|-
| align="right"| January 19, 1923 || Bell Boy 13 || Distribution
|-
| align="right"| January 23, 1923 || Money! Money! Money! || Distribution
|-
| align="right"| January 28, 1923 ||  || Distribution
|-
| align="right"| February 4, 1923 || What a Wife Learned || Distribution
|-
| align="right"| February 4, 1923 ||  || Distribution
|-
| align="right"| February 12, 1923 || Mighty Lak' a Rose || Distribution
|-
| align="right"| February 26, 1923 ||  || Distribution
|-
| align="right"| March 5, 1923 || Scars of Jealousy || Distribution
|-
| align="right"| March 12, 1923 || Refuge || Distribution
|-
| align="right"| March 18, 1923 ||  || Distribution
|-
| align="right"| March 26, 1923 || Daddy || Distribution
|-
| align="right"| April 9, 1923 || Her Fatal Millions || Distribution
|-
| align="right"| April 16, 1923 || Slander the Woman || Distribution
|-
| align="right"| April 22, 1923 ||  || Distribution
|-
| align="right"| April 23, 1923 ||  || Distribution
|-
| align="right"| April 30, 1923 || Within the Law || Distribution
|-
| align="right"| May 3, 1923 ||  || Production and distribution
|-
| align="right"| May 7, 1923 ||  || Distribution
|-
| align="right"| June 3, 1923 ||  || Distribution
|-
| align="right"| June 4, 1923 || Children of Dust || Distribution
|-
| align="right"| June 11, 1923 || Slippy McGee || Distribution
|-
| align="right"| June 18, 1923 || Penrod and Sam || Distribution
|-
| align="right"| July 1, 1923 || Wandering Daughters || Distribution
|-
| align="right"| July 15, 1923 ||  || Distribution
|-
| align="right"| July 22, 1923 ||  || Distribution
|-
| align="right"| July 29, 1923 || Trilby || Distribution
|-
| align="right"| July 30, 1923 || Circus Days || Distribution
|-
| align="right"| August 20, 1923 || The Huntress || Distribution
|-
| align="right"| August 27, 1923 || Dulcy || Distribution
|-
| align="right"| September 1923 ||  || Distribution
|-
| align="right"| September 1923 || Her Reputation || Distribution
|-
| align="right"| September 1, 1923 ||  || Distribution
|-
| align="right"| September 10, 1923 ||  || Distribution
|-
| align="right"| September 16, 1923 || Potash and Perlmutter || Distribution
|-
| align="right"| October 1, 1923 || Ashes of Vengeance || Distribution
|-
| align="right"| October 8, 1923 ||  || Distribution
|-
| align="right"| October 15, 1923 || Thundergate || Distribution
|-
| align="right"| October 22, 1923 ||  || Distribution
|-
| align="right"| October 29, 1923 || Ponjola || Distribution
|-
| align="right"| November 12, 1923 || Flaming Youth || Production and distribution
|-
| align="right"| November 12, 1923 || Jealous Husbands || Distribution
|-
| align="right"| November 19, 1923 ||  || Distribution
|-
| align="right"| November 26, 1923 ||  || Distribution
|-
| align="right"| November 28, 1923 || Anna Christie || Distribution
|-
| align="right"| December 17, 1923 ||  || Distribution
|-
| align="right"| December 17, 1923 || Twenty-One || Distribution
|-
| align="right"| December 23, 1923 || Boy of Mine || Distribution
|-
| align="right"| December 23, 1923 || Her Temporary Husband || Distribution
|-
| align="right"| December 24, 1923 ||  || Distribution
|-
| align="right"| December 29, 1923 || Black Oxen || Distribution
|-
| align="right"| December 30, 1923 || Boy of Mine || Distribution
|-
| align="right"| December 31, 1923 || Chastity || Distribution
|-
| align="right"| January 1924 || Painted People || Distribution
|-
| align="right"| January 21, 1924 || Abraham Lincoln || Distribution
|-
| align="right"| February 1924 ||  || Distribution
|-
| align="right"| February 3, 1924 || When a Man's a Man || Distribution
|-
| align="right"| February 25, 1924 || Torment || Distribution
|-
| align="right"| February 29, 1924 || Lilies of the Field || Distribution
|-
| align="right"| March 1, 1924 || Flowing Gold || Distribution
|-
| align="right"| March 3, 1924 || Why Men Leave Home || Distribution
|-
| align="right"| March 10, 1924 ||  || Distribution
|-
| align="right"| March 24, 1924 ||  || Production and distribution
|-
| align="right"| March 24, 1924 || Secrets || Distribution
|-
| align="right"| March 30, 1924 ||  || Distribution
|-
| align="right"| April 5, 1924 ||  || Distribution
|-
| align="right"| April 13, 1924 ||  || Distribution
|-
| align="right"| April 20, 1924 ||  || Production and distribution
|-
| align="right"| April 27, 1924 || Those Who Dance || Distribution
|-
| align="right"| May 4, 1924 || Cytherea || Distribution
|-
| align="right"| May 11, 1924 ||  || Distribution
|-
| align="right"| May 25, 1924 ||  || Production and distribution
|-
| align="right"| June 14, 1924 ||  || Distribution
|-
| align="right"| June 15, 1924 || For Sale || Production and distribution
|-
| align="right"| June 29, 1924 ||  || Distribution
|-
| align="right"| July 20, 1924 ||  || Distribution
|-
| align="right"| July 27, 1924 || Single Wives || Distribution
|-
| align="right"| August 1924 || Tarnish || Distribution
|-
| align="right"| September 1, 1924 || In Hollywood with Potash and Perlmutter || Distribution
|-
| align="right"| September 28, 1924 || In Every Woman's Life || Distribution
|-
| align="right"| October 1, 1924 || Her Night of Romance || Distribution
|-
| align="right"| October 5, 1924 ||  || Distribution
|-
| align="right"| October 12, 1924 || Christine of the Hungry Heart || Distribution
|-
| align="right"| October 19, 1924 || Madonna of the Streets || Distribution
|-
| align="right"| October 26, 1924 ||  || Distribution
|-
| align="right"| November 2, 1924 || Husbands and Lovers || Distribution
|-
| align="right"| November 23, 1924 || Classmates || Distribution
|-
| align="right"| November 30, 1924 || Inez from Hollywood || Distribution
|-
| align="right"| December 7, 1924 || Born Rich || Distribution
|-
| align="right"| December 14, 1924 || Love's Wilderness || Distribution
|-
| align="right"| December 21, 1924 || Idle Tongues || Distribution
|-
| align="right"| December 28, 1924 || So Big || Production and distribution
|-
| align="right"| January 4, 1925 || Flaming Love || Distribution
|-
| align="right"| January 11, 1925 || As Man Desires || Production and distribution
|-
| align="right"| January 18, 1925 ||  || Distribution
|-
| align="right"| January 25, 1925 ||  || Distribution
|-
| align="right"| January 25, 1925 || Learning to Love || Distribution
|-
| align="right"| February 1, 1925 || Enticement || Distribution
|-
| align="right"| February 2, 1925 ||  || Production and distribution
|-
| align="right"| February 15, 1925 || If I Marry Again || Production and distribution
|-
| align="right"| February 22, 1925 || Her Husband's Secret || Distribution
|-
| align="right"| March 1, 1925 || New Toys || Distribution
|-
| align="right"| March 15, 1925 ||  || Distribution
|-
| align="right"| March 15, 1925 || One Year to Live || Production and distribution
|-
| align="right"| March 22, 1925 || Déclassée || Distribution
|-
| align="right"| March 22, 1925 || I Want My Man || Distribution
|-
| align="right"| March 29, 1925 || Sally || Production and distribution
|-
| align="right"| April 12, 1925 || His Supreme Moment || Distribution
|-
| align="right"| April 12, 1925 || One Way Street || Production and distribution
|-
| align="right"| April 30, 1925 || Playing with Souls || Distribution
|-
| align="right"| May 3, 1925 || Soul-Fire || Distribution
|-
| align="right"| May 10, 1925 || Chickie || Production and distribution
|-
| align="right"| May 17, 1925 ||  || Production and distribution
|-
| align="right"| May 24, 1925 ||  || Production and distribution
|-
| align="right"| June 7, 1925 ||  || Distribution
|-
| align="right"| June 16, 1925 || Just a Woman || Production and distribution
|-
| align="right"| June 21, 1925 ||  || Distribution
|-
| align="right"| June 21, 1925 ||  || Production and distribution
|-
| align="right"| July 12, 1925 ||  || Production and distribution
|-
| align="right"| July 19, 1925 ||  || Distribution
|-
| align="right"| July 26, 1925 ||  || Distribution
|-
| align="right"| August 2, 1925 || Her Sister from Paris || Distribution
|-
| align="right"| August 9, 1925 || Fine Clothes || Distribution
|-
| align="right"| August 16, 1925 ||  || Production and distribution
|-
| align="right"| August 16, 1925 || Winds of Chance || Production and distribution
|-
| align="right"| August 23, 1925 ||  || Distribution
|-
| align="right"| August 30, 1925 || Graustark || Distribution
|-
| align="right"| September 1925 || Sandra || Distribution
|-
| align="right"| September 6, 1925 || Shore Leave || Distribution
|-
| align="right"| September 13, 1925 || What Fools Men || Production and distribution
|-
| align="right"| September 20, 1925 ||  || Distribution
|-
| align="right"| September 27, 1925 ||  || Distribution
|-
| align="right"| October 4, 1925 ||  || Production and distribution
|-
| align="right"| October 5, 1925 ||  || Production and distribution
|-
| align="right"| October 11, 1925 || Classified || Distribution
|-
| align="right"| October 18, 1925 ||  || Production and distribution
|-
| align="right"| October 18, 1925 || Why Women Love || Distribution
|-
| align="right"| October 25, 1925 ||  || Distribution
|-
| align="right"| November 1, 1925 ||  || Distribution
|-
| align="right"| November 8, 1925 || Scarlet Saint || Production and distribution
|-
| align="right"| November 15, 1925 || We Moderns || Distribution
|-
| align="right"| November 22, 1925 ||  || Production and distribution
|-
| align="right"| November 25, 1925 || Clothes Make the Pirate || Distribution
|-
| align="right"| December 6, 1925 ||  || Distribution
|-
| align="right"| December 13, 1925 || Joanna || Distribution
|-
| align="right"| December 27, 1925 || Infatuation || Distribution
|-
| align="right"| January 3, 1926 || Too Much Money || Production and distribution
|-
| align="right"| January 10, 1926 || Just Suppose || Distribution
|-
| align="right"| January 13, 1926 || Bluebeard's Seven Wives || Production and distribution
|-
| align="right"| January 24, 1926 ||  || Distribution
|-
| align="right"| January 31, 1926 ||  || Distribution
|-
| align="right"| February 1, 1926 || Memory Lane || Distribution
|-
| align="right"| February 7, 1926 || Rainbow Riley || Distribution
|-
| align="right"| February 14, 1926 ||  || Production and distribution
|-
| align="right"| February 21, 1926 || Irene || Production and distribution
|-
| align="right"| February 28, 1926 ||  || Production and distribution
|-
| align="right"| March 14, 1926 || High Steppers || Distribution
|-
| align="right"| March 21, 1926 || Mademoiselle Modiste || Distribution
|-
| align="right"| March 21, 1926 || Tramp, Tramp, Tramp || Distribution
|-
| align="right"| March 28, 1926 || Her Second Chance || Production
|-
| align="right"| April 4, 1926 || Kiki || Distribution
|-
| align="right"| April 11, 1926 || Old Loves and New || Distribution
|-
| align="right"| May 2, 1926 ||  || Production and distribution
|-
| align="right"| May 16, 1926 ||  || Distribution
|-
| align="right"| May 23, 1926 ||  || Distribution
|-
| align="right"| May 30, 1926 || Ranson's Folly || Distribution
|-
| align="right"| June 6, 1926 || Ella Cinders || Distribution
|-
| align="right"| June 13, 1926 || Sweet Daddies || Production and distribution
|-
| align="right"| June 17, 1926 ||  || Distribution
|-
| align="right"| June 20, 1926 || Puppets || Distribution
|-
| align="right"| June 27, 1926 || Miss Nobody || Production and distribution
|-
| align="right"| July 4, 1926 || The Brown Derby || Distribution
|-
| align="right"| July 11, 1926 || Men of Steel || Production and distribution
|-
| align="right"| July 11, 1926 ||  || Production and distribution
|-
| align="right"| July 25, 1926 ||  || Distribution
|-
| align="right"| July 26, 1926 || Mismates || Production and distribution
|-
| align="right"| August 1, 1926 || Señor Daredevil || Distribution
|-
| align="right"| August 8, 1926 || Into Her Kingdom || Distribution
|-
| align="right"| August 8, 1926 || Pals First || Distribution
|-
| align="right"| August 15, 1926 ||  || Distribution
|-
| align="right"| August 22, 1926 || It Must Be Love || Distribution
|-
| align="right"| September 4, 1926 || Don Juan's Three Nights || Distribution
|-
| align="right"| September 5, 1926 ||  || Distribution
|-
| align="right"| September 5, 1926 ||  || Distribution
|-
| align="right"| September 12, 1926 || Subway Sadie || Distribution
|-
| align="right"| September 26, 1926 || Paradise || Distribution
|-
| align="right"| October 17, 1926 ||  || Distribution
|-
| align="right"| October 17, 1926 || Forever After || Production and distribution
|-
| align="right"| October 25, 1926 || Midnight Lovers || Distribution
|-
| align="right"| October 31, 1926 || Syncopating Sue || Distribution
|-
| align="right"| November 14, 1926 || Stepping Along || Distribution
|-
| align="right"| November 14, 1926 ||  || Distribution
|-
| align="right"| November 15, 1926 || Ladies at Play || Production and distribution
|-
| align="right"| November 20, 1926 ||  || Distribution
|-
| align="right"| November 21, 1926 ||  || Production and distribution
|-
| align="right"| November 28, 1926 || Twinkletoes || Distribution
|-
| align="right"| December 12, 1926 || Just Another Blonde || Distribution
|-
| align="right"| December 12, 1926 ||  || Distribution
|-
| align="right"| January 1, 1927 ||  || Distribution
|-
| align="right"| January 2, 1927 ||  || Production and distribution
|-
| align="right"| January 16, 1927 ||  || Production and distribution
|-
| align="right"| January 23, 1927 ||  || Distribution
|-
| align="right"| January 31, 1927 ||  || Distribution
|-
| align="right"| February 6, 1927 || McFadden's Flats || Production and distribution
|-
| align="right"| February 13, 1927 ||  || Distribution
|-
| align="right"| February 20, 1927 || Easy Pickings || Production and distribution
|-
| align="right"| February 27, 1927 ||  || Production and distribution
|-
| align="right"| March 5, 1927 || Three Hours || Distribution
|-
| align="right"| March 6, 1927 || Orchids and Ermine || Distribution
|-
| align="right"| March 13, 1927 || High Hat || Distribution
|-
| align="right"| March 20, 1927 || Venus of Venice || Production and distribution
|-
| align="right"| March 26, 1927 || Long Pants || Distribution
|-
| align="right"| March 27, 1927 ||  || Distribution
|-
| align="right"| April 3, 1927 || Somewhere in Sonora || Distribution
|-
| align="right"| April 17, 1927 || See You in Jail || Distribution
|-
| align="right"| April 21, 1927 || Camille || Distribution
|-
| align="right"| April 24, 1927 || Convoy || Distribution
|-
| align="right"| May 1, 1927 || All Aboard || Distribution
|-
| align="right"| May 1, 1927 ||  || Distribution
|-
| align="right"| May 15, 1927 || Broadway Nights || Distribution
|-
| align="right"| May 22, 1927 || Babe Comes Home || Production and distribution
|-
| align="right"| May 29, 1927 || Lost at the Front || Distribution
|-
| align="right"| June 5, 1927 ||  || Distribution
|-
| align="right"| June 5, 1927 ||  || Production and distribution
|-
| align="right"| June 12, 1927 || Dance Magic || Distribution
|-
| align="right"| June 19, 1927 || Framed || Production and distribution
|-
| align="right"| June 26, 1927 || Naughty but Nice || Distribution
|-
| align="right"| July 3, 1927 || Lonesome Ladies || Production and distribution
|-
| align="right"| July 9, 1927 ||  || Distribution
|-
| align="right"| July 10, 1927 ||  || Distribution
|-
| align="right"| July 24, 1927 || White Pants Willie || Distribution
|-
| align="right"| July 31, 1927 || For the Love of Mike || Distribution
|-
| align="right"| August 7, 1927 ||  || Distribution
|-
| align="right"| August 14, 1927 ||  || Production and distribution
|-
| align="right"| August 21, 1927 || Hard-Boiled Haggerty || Production and distribution
|-
| align="right"| August 28, 1927 || Three's a Crowd || Distribution
|-
| align="right"| September 1, 1927 ||  || Production and distribution
|-
| align="right"| September 3, 1927 ||  || Production and distribution
|-
| align="right"| September 11, 1927 || Smile, Brother, Smile || Distribution
|-
| align="right"| September 25, 1927 ||  || Production and distribution
|-
| align="right"| September 25, 1927 || Rose of the Golden West || Production and distribution
|-
| align="right"| September 27, 1927 ||  || Distribution
|-
| align="right"| October 9, 1927 || American Beauty || Production and distribution
|-
| align="right"| October 16, 1927 ||  || Distribution
|-
| align="right"| October 23, 1927 || Breakfast at Sunrise || Distribution
|-
| align="right"| October 30, 1927 || No Place to Go || Distribution
|-
| align="right"| November 6, 1927 || Gun Gospel || Distribution
|-
| align="right"| November 13, 1927 ||  || Production and distribution
|-
| align="right"| November 20, 1927 || Home Made || Distribution
|-
| align="right"| November 27, 1927 || Man Crazy || Distribution
|-
| align="right"| December 4, 1927 ||  || Production and distribution
|-
| align="right"| December 4, 1927 ||  || Production and distribution
|-
| align="right"| December 9, 1927 ||  || Production and distribution
|-
| align="right"| December 10, 1927 || French Dressing || Production and distribution
|-
| align="right"| December 18, 1927 ||  || Production and distribution
|-
| align="right"| December 25, 1927 || Her Wild Oat || Production and distribution
|-
| align="right"| January 1, 1928 || The Shepherd of the Hills || 
|-
| align="right"| January 22, 1928 || Sailors' Wives || Production and distribution
|-
| align="right"| January 29, 1928 ||  || Production and distribution
|-
| align="right"| February 5, 1928 ||  || Production and distribution
|-
| align="right"| February 19, 1928 ||  || Production and distribution
|-
| align="right"| February 26, 1928 || Flying Romeos || Production and distribution
|-
| align="right"| March 4, 1928 || Mad Hour || Production and distribution
|-
| align="right"| March 11, 1928 || Burning Daylight || Production and distribution
|-
| align="right"| March 18, 1928 ||  || Production and distribution
|-
| align="right"| March 25, 1928 ||  || Production and distribution
|-
| align="right"| April 8, 1928 ||  || Production and distribution
|-
| align="right"| April 15, 1928 || Chinatown Charlie || Production and distribution
|-
| align="right"| April 22, 1928 ||  || Distribution
|-
| align="right"| April 29, 1928 || Harold Teen || Production and distribution
|-
| align="right"| May 6, 1928 || Lady Be Good || Production and distribution
|-
| align="right"| May 13, 1928 || Vamping Venus || Production and distribution
|-
| align="right"| May 20, 1928 ||  || Production and distribution
|-
| align="right"| May 27, 1928 ||  || Production and distribution
|-
| align="right"| June 3, 1928 ||  || Production and distribution
|-
| align="right"| June 10, 1928 || Three-Ring Marriage || Production and distribution
|-
| align="right"| June 17, 1928 || Wheel of Chance || Production and distribution
|-
| align="right"| June 24, 1928 || Happiness Ahead || Production and distribution
|-
| align="right"| July 1, 1928 || The Code of the Scarlet || Distribution
|-
| align="right"| July 8, 1928 || The Good-Bye Kiss || Distribution
|-
| align="right"| July 8, 1928 ||  || Production and distribution
|-
| align="right"| July 22, 1928 || Heart to Heart || Production and distribution
|-
| align="right"| August 5, 1928 || The Wright Idea || 
|-
| align="right"| August 19, 1928 || Out of the Ruins || Production and distribution
|-
| align="right"| August 26, 1928 || Oh, Kay! || Production and distribution
|-
| align="right"| September 9, 1928 ||  || Production and distribution
|-
| align="right"| September 16, 1928 || Waterfront || Production and distribution
|-
| align="right"| September 16, 1928 || The Whip || Production and distribution
|-
| align="right"| September 23, 1928 || Show Girl || Production and distribution
|-
| align="right"| October 7, 1928 ||  || Production and distribution
|-
| align="right"| October 14, 1928 || Do Your Duty || Production and distribution
|-
| align="right"| October 18, 1928 || Lilac Time || Production and distribution
|-
| align="right"| October 21, 1928 ||  || Distribution
|-
| align="right"| October 28, 1928 || The Glorious Trail || 
|-
| align="right"| November 4, 1928 ||  || Production and distribution
|-
| align="right"| November 11, 1928 || Outcast || Production and distribution
|-
| align="right"| December 2, 1928 || Adoration || Production and distribution
|-
| align="right"| December 5, 1928 ||  || Production and distribution
|-
| align="right"| December 16, 1928 || Naughty Baby || Production and distribution
|-
| align="right"| December 23, 1928 ||  || Production and distribution
|-
| align="right"| December 29, 1928 || Scarlet Seas || Production and distribution
|-
| align="right"| January 6, 1929 || Synthetic Sin || Production and distribution
|-
| align="right"| February 10, 1929 || Weary River || Production and distribution
|-
| align="right"| February 17, 1929 ||  || Production and distribution
|-
| align="right"| February 17, 1929 ||  || Production and distribution
|-
| align="right"| February 17, 1929 || Seven Footprints to Satan || Production and distribution
|-
| align="right"| March 3, 1929 || Children of the Ritz || Production and distribution
|-
| align="right"| March 12, 1929 || Why Be Good? || Production and distribution
|-
| align="right"| March 24, 1929 || Love and the Devil || Production and distribution
|-
| align="right"| March 31, 1929 ||  || Production and distribution
|-
| align="right"| April 2, 1929 || His Captive Woman || Production and distribution
|-
| align="right"| April 7, 1929 ||  || Production and distribution
|-
| align="right"| April 28, 1929 ||  || Production and distribution
|-
| align="right"| May 5, 1929 || Hot Stuff || Production and distribution
|-
| align="right"| May 8, 1929 ||  || Production and distribution
|-
| align="right"| May 12, 1929 || Two Weeks Off || Production and distribution
|-
| align="right"| June 2, 1929 || Careers || Production and distribution
|-
| align="right"| June 21, 1929 || Broadway Babies || Production and distribution
|-
| align="right"| June 23, 1929 ||  || Production and distribution
|-
| align="right"| July 7, 1929 ||  || Production and distribution
|-
| align="right"| July 20, 1929 || Drag || Production and distribution
|-
| align="right"| July 28, 1929 || Smiling Irish Eyes || Production and distribution
|-
| align="right"| August 4, 1929 || Hard to Get || Production and distribution
|-
| align="right"| August 11, 1928 || Dark Streets || Production and distribution
|-
| align="right"| August 25, 1929 || Her Private Life || Production and distribution
|-
| align="right"| August 31, 1929 ||  || Production and distribution
|-
| align="right"| September 15, 1929 ||  || Production and distribution
|-
| align="right"| October 1, 1929 || Young Nowheres || Production and distribution
|-
| align="right"| October 25, 1929 ||  || Production and distribution
|-
| align="right"| November 4, 1929 || Paris || Production and distribution
|}

Films as a Warner Bros. subsidiary
As a subsidiary of Warner Bros., First National Pictures, Inc., continued to be a copyright claimant and trademark on motion pictures until 1936. Notable examples of First National Pictures titles are listed below.

1929

 Fast Life Footlights and Fools The Forward Pass The Girl from Woolworth's The Girl in the Glass Cage Little Johnny Jones The Love Racket A Most Immoral Lady The Painted Angel Prisoners Sally Wedding Rings1930

 Back Pay The Bad Man Bride of the Regiment Bright Lights College Lovers The Dawn Patrol The Flirting Widow The Furies The Girl of the Golden West Going Wild The Gorilla In the Next Room Kismet The Lash Lilies of the Field Loose Ankles Mothers Cry Murder Will Out No, No, Nanette A Notorious Affair Numbered Men One Night at Susie's The Other Tomorrow Playing Around Road to Paradise Scarlet Pages Show Girl in Hollywood Son of the Gods Song of the Flame Spring Is Here Strictly Modern Sunny Sweet Mama Sweethearts and Wives Top Speed The Truth About Youth The Way of All Men The Widow from Chicago1931

 The Bargain Big Business Girl Broadminded Chances Compromised Father's Son The Finger Points Five Star Final Her Majesty, Love Honor of the Family The Hot Heiress I Like Your Nerve Kiss Me Again The Lady Who Dared The Last Flight Little Caesar Local Boy Makes Good Men of the Sky Misbehaving Ladies The Naughty Flirt Party Husband Penrod and Sam The Reckless Hour The Right of Way The Ruling Voice Safe in Hell Too Young to Marry Woman Hungry1932

 Alias the Doctor Cabin in the Cotton Central Park The Crash Crooner The Dark Horse Doctor X The Famous Ferguson Case Fireman, Save My Child Frisco Jenny The Hatchet Man It's Tough to Be Famous Life Begins Love Is a Racket The Match King Miss Pinkerton The Rich Are Always with Us Silver Dollar The Strange Love of Molly Louvain The Tenderfoot They Call It Sin Three on a Match Tiger Shark 20,000 Years in Sing Sing Two Seconds Union Depot Week-End Marriage The Woman from Monte Carlo You Said a Mouthful1933

 Blondie Johnson Bureau of Missing Persons Central Airport Convention City Elmer, the Great Employees' Entrance Female Goodbye Again Grand Slam Havana Widows Heroes for Sale I Loved a Woman Lilly Turner The Little Giant The Mind Reader She Had to Say Yes Son of a Sailor Wild Boys of the Road The World Changes1934

 Babbitt Bedside The Big Shakedown British Agent The Church Mouse The Circus Clown Dark Hazard The Dragon Murder Case Fashions of 1934 Flirtation Walk Fog Over Frisco Gentlemen Are Born Happiness Ahead I Sell Anything Journal of a Crime A Lost Lady The Man with Two Faces Mandalay Massacre The Merry Frinks Midnight Alibi Murder in the Clouds Registered Nurse Return of the Terror Side Streets 6 Day Bike Rider Twenty Million Sweethearts A Very Honorable Guy Wonder Bar1935

 Black Fury The Case of the Curious Bride G Men The Girl from 10th Avenue Go into Your Dance Gold Diggers of 1935 In Caliente The Irish in Us Living on Velvet Maybe It's Love Oil for the Lamps of China Red Hot Tires Traveling Saleslady While the Patient Slept The Woman in Red1936

 The Case of the Velvet Claws Here Comes Carter Earthworm Tractors''

References

First National Pictures
First National Pictures